Find, FIND or Finding may refer to:

Computing
 find (Unix), a command on UNIX platforms
 find (Windows), a command on DOS/Windows platforms

Books
 The Find (2010), by Kathy Page
 The Find (2014), by William Hope Hodgson

Film and television
 "The Find", an episode of Beyond Belief: Fact or Fiction
 "The Find", an episode of reality TV show The Curse of Oak Island

Music
 Find (Hidden in Plain View EP), 2001
 Find (SS501 EP)
 The Find, a 2005 hip hop album by Ohmega Watts

People
 Áed Find (died 778), king of Dál Riata (modern-day Scotland)
 Caittil Find, Norse-Gaelic warrior contingent leader
 Cumméne Find (died 669), seventh abbot of Iona, Scotland

Other uses
 Find, in archaeology
 Finding (jewelcrafting), jewellery components
 Meteorite find, a found meteorite not observed to have fallen
 Foundation for Innovative New Diagnostics, a not-for-profit organisation
 Facial Images National Database

See also
 Discovery (observation)
 Finder (disambiguation)
 Locate (disambiguation)
 Searching (disambiguation)
 Result (disambiguation)